LATAM Airlines (formerly LAN Airlines and LAN-Chile) is a Chilean multinational airline based in Santiago, Chile and one of the founders of LATAM Airlines Group, Latin America's largest airline holding company. The main hub is Arturo Merino Benítez International Airport in Santiago, with secondary hubs in São Paulo, Lima, Bogotá, Quito, Guayaquil and Asunción airports.

LAN was the flag carrier of Chile until its privatization in the 1990s, is the predominant airline in Chile, Ecuador and Peru, and the second-largest carrier in Colombia, through its local subsidiaries. LAN is the largest airline in Latin America, serving Latin America, Northern America, the Caribbean, Oceania, Asia, and Europe. The carrier was a member of the Oneworld airline alliance from 2000 to 2020.

LATAM Airlines Group was formed after the takeover by LAN and Brazilian TAM Linhas Aéreas, which was completed on June 22, 2012. In August 2015, it was announced that the two airlines would fully rebrand as LATAM, with one livery to be applied on all aircraft by 2018. Currently, LATAM Chile and LATAM Brasil continue to work as separate companies, under LATAM Airlines Group acting as the executive management. LATAM Airlines Group is currently the largest airline corporation in Latin America.

History

Early years

The airline was founded by Chilean Air Force Commodore Arturo Merino Benítez (after whom Santiago International Airport is named), and began operations on March 5, 1929, as Línea Aeropostal Santiago-Arica (English: Postal Air Line Santiago-Arica), under the government of President Carlos Ibáñez del Campo. In 1932 It was rebranded as Línea Aérea Nacional de Chile (English: National Air Line of Chile), using the acronym LAN Chile as its commercial name. LAN Chile's first fleet consisted of de Havilland Moth planes.

Merino Benitez was a strong defender of Chilean carriers exclusivity on domestic routes, differing from most Latin American countries which easily granted the authorization on domestic flights to US-based Panagra, influenced by the propaganda made by Charles Lindbergh's Atlantic crossing. Also because of this reason, US-built airplanes became more difficult to incorporate to LAN's fleet until the beginning of WWII. In 1936, 2 French Potez 560 airplanes were purchased while in 1938, 4 German Junkers Ju 86Bs were incorporated into the fleet. During that same year, a cooperation agreement was established with Lloyd Aéreo Boliviano and the Peruvian carrier Faucett. Another agreement with Lufthansa was signed for flights to and from Europe and America's Atlantic coast.

In 1940, given the restrictions imposed during WWII on access to spare parts for the Junker's BMW engines, LAN Chile had to replace them with Lockheed Model 10A Electras, adding in 1941 further Lockheed Lodestar C-60 and Douglas DC-3 in 1945.

Post-war and international service expansion
On August 23, 1945, LAN Chile became a member of the newly formed IATA. In October 1946, it started international service to Buenos Aires at Morón Airport and in 1947 to Punta Arenas, Chile's most distant continental destination.

In December 1954, LAN Chile made its first commercial flight to Lima, Perú. On December 22, 1956, a LAN Chile Douglas DC-6B made the world's first commercial flight over Antarctica. Since then, all of LAN's DC-6 fleet had painted on their fuselage Primeros sobre la Antártica ("The first over Antarctica"), using this same aircraft type for its first commercial service to Miami International Airport in 1958.

LAN Chile entered the jet era in 1963, purchasing three French Sud Aviation Caravelle VI-R, which initially flew to Miami, Guayaquil, Lima, Panama City and within Chile to Punta Arenas, Puerto Montt and Antofagasta.

In 1966, LAN Chile purchased its first Boeing 707 from Lufthansa, in exchange for flying rights in the Lima-Santiago route. With this aircraft model, the company developed new long haul routes to the US, Oceania and Europe. LAN-Chile started on April 15, 1967, the route Santiago-John F. Kennedy International Airport and Santiago-Easter Island on April 8. In October 1967 a LAN Chile Sud Aviation Caravelle made the first ILS landing in South America at Lima's Jorge Chávez International Airport. On January 16, 1968, the Santiago-Easter Island flight was extended to Papeete-Faa'a International Airport, in Tahiti, French Polynesia using a Douglas DC-6B. The airline then introduced Boeing 707 jet service on the Santiago – Easter Island –Papeete, Tahiti route in April 1970. On September 4, 1974, this route was extended to Fiji.

In 1969, LAN Chile expanded its destinations to Rio de Janeiro, Asunción and Cali with new Boeing 727s. In 1970, with Boeing 707s, LAN Chile opened its first transatlantic routes to Madrid–Barajas Airport, Frankfurt Airport and Paris-Orly.

Since its inception and until 1970,  the airline had its headquarters, main hub and maintenance center at Los Cerrillos Airport, in southwest Santiago. The restrictions imposed by the growing metropolitan area of Santiago and the need for modern, jet-era airport facilities that could safely accommodate both domestic and intercontinental flights, drove the need to relocate the Chilean capital's principal airport from Los Cerrillos in the denser southwest metropolitan region of Santiago to the more rural northwest metropolitan area. For this reason, Santiago International Airport in Pudahuel was built between 1961 and 1967, fully moving LAN Chile's flights to this new airport in 1970.

On February 10, 1974, a LAN Chile Boeing 707 flown by captain Jorge Jarpa Reyes made the world's first transpolar non-stop flight between South America (Punta Arenas Airport) and Australia (Sydney Kingsford-Smith Airport).

In 1980, the company replaced its Boeing 727s with the Boeing 737-200 on its domestic routes. Also, McDonnell Douglas DC-10-30s, LAN Chile's first wide-body jets, were added for use on routes to Los Angeles, Miami, and New York. That same year, the maintenance facilities were relocated from Los Cerrillos to Arturo Merino Benitez Airport.

In 1985, LAN Chile implemented a program of flights around the world called Cruceros del Aire ("Air Cruises"), pioneers and unique in Latin America. The initial version included two flights per year (April 26 and September 26) on a Boeing 707 named Three Oceans because it crossed the Atlantic, Indian and South Pacific oceans, visiting 18 different places. The aircraft was specially prepared for these flights. It had 80 seats in first class, thus providing passengers with ample room for their comfort. Eighty tourists were selected for a 31-day tour that included visits to the main cities of Africa, Asia and Oceania. Such flights were made until 1989, marketed according to their route under various names such as "Around the World", "Three Oceans", "Three Continents", "Mediterranean","East-West China", etc.

In June 1986, Boeing 767-200ERs replaced the DC-10 fleet, with a new route to Montréal–Mirabel International Airport.

In 1988, LAN Chile started construction of its maintenance center at Santiago Airport and added a Boeing 747-100 on lease from Aer Lingus to its fleet during the summer season for its US flights.

Privatization and internationalization

In September 1989, the Chilean government privatized the carrier, selling a majority stake in the company to Icarosan and Scandinavian Airlines (49%), which subsequently sold its stake a few years later to local investors. Since 1994, major shareholders have been the Cueto Family and businessman Sebastián Piñera (until 2010), who sold his shares when taking office as President of the Republic of Chile.

The approval from the Chilean Anti-Trust Authority resulted in the acquisition of the country's second-largest airline Ladeco on August 11, 1995. In October 1998, LAN-Chile merged its cargo subsidiary Fast Air Carrier with Ladeco, forming LAN Express.

In 1998 LAN Airlines established a joint venture with Lufthansa called LLTT (Lufthansa-LAN Technical Training S.A.) with the aim to satisfy the needs for aircraft maintenance training in Latin America. LLTT is based at LAN's hangars in Comodoro Arturo Merino Benitez Airport. LLTT is the only A320 Maintenance Simulator (CMOS) training provider in Latin America.

In 2000, LAN Cargo opened up a major operations base at Miami International Airport and currently operates one of its largest cargo facilities there.

In 2002, LAN Chile started its internationalization process through LAN Perú and LAN Ecuador.

In March 2004, LAN-Chile and its subsidiaries, LAN Perú, LAN Ecuador, LAN Dominicana and LAN Express, became unified under the unique LAN brand and livery, eliminating each airline country name on the brands. On June 17, 2004, LAN-Chile changed its formal name to LAN Airlines (which was said to mean Latin American Network Airlines, even though the airline says LAN is no longer an acronym) as part of this re-branding and internationalization process; although, when founded in 1929, LAN originally meant "Línea Aérea Nacional" (National Airline).

In March 2005, LAN opened its subsidiary LAN Argentina in Argentina and operates national and international flights from Buenos Aires, and is the third-largest local operator behind Aerolíneas Argentinas and Austral. This subsidiary is also under the LAN brand.

As of August 1, 2006, LAN merged first and business classes of service into a single class, named Premium Business.

On October 28, 2010, LAN acquired 98% of the shares of AIRES, the second-largest air carrier in Colombia. On December 3, 2011, AIRES started operating as LAN Colombia under the unified LAN livery.

Since May 5, 2016, LAN has been operating as LATAM Chile. The airline opened many routes during 2017, one of them being the longest flight in their history: Santiago to Melbourne, which started operating October 5 of that year.

LATAM Airlines Group

On August 13, 2010, LAN Airlines signed a non-binding agreement with Brazilian airline TAM Linhas Aéreas to merge, and form the LATAM Airlines Group. The merger was completed on June 22, 2012. The Administrative Council of Economic Defense of Brazil ("CADE") and the Tribunal de Defensa de la Libre Competencia (Chilean Court at Law for Antitrust) ("TDLC") approved the merger subject to mitigation measures. The airlines have to surrender four daily São Paulo–Guarulhos International Airport slot pairs to other airlines willing to fly the Santiago-São Paulo route, to give up membership in either Star Alliance (of which TAM Linhas Aéreas was a member) or Oneworld, and to interline deals with other airlines that operate selected routes, among other provisions. It still continued to use their call sign "LAN CHILE" as well as their IATA and ICAO identifies after the merger for their flights operated by LATAM Chile.

During the first half of 2018, the airline was struggling due to the Rolls-Royce engines on their Boeing 787 Dreamliner fleet, having grounded at least six of them since February 2018. In April 2018, their domestic subsidiary LATAM Express experienced a major worker strike. This has caused several economic losses for the airline. Later that same year they started recovering from that and are expecting to resume 787 deliveries by 2019, which resumed with CC-BGO in November of that year.

Corporate affairs
The airline has its headquarters on the 20th floor of the 5711 Avenida Presidente Riesco Building in Las Condes, Santiago Province. Previously its headquarters were in Estado 10 in downtown Santiago de Chile.

Subsidiaries
LATAM Brasil
LATAM Colombia
LATAM Ecuador 
LATAM Express
LATAM Paraguay
LATAM Perú

Cargo branches
LATAM Cargo Brasil
LATAM Cargo Chile
LATAM Cargo Colombia

Former subsidiaries
Aeroasis
Ladeco
LAN Dominicana
LATAM Argentina
Fast Air Carrier
Florida West International Airways
Mas Air

Destinations

LATAM Chile operates in 30 international destinations in 16 countries along with 17 domestic in Chile. With the delivery of more Airbus A320s and Airbus A321s, it will start new destinations in South America; it has considered Panama, San Jose de Costa Rica, Curitiba, Asunción, Manaus, Rosario, Cuzco and others. LATAM Chile was a popular choice for surfers traveling to South America because of their policy of not charging extra baggage fees. However, starting on December 19, 2016, they changed their policy and now charge US$200 per way for a surfboard bag of up to three boards.

On October 5, 2017, LATAM Chile inaugurated their direct route between Santiago and Melbourne, a 15-hour (westbound) and  flight. It is currently the southernmost commercial point-to-point flight. The flight's great circle passes south of the Antarctic Circle, at a distance of approx 800 km off the Antarctic mainland. The flight numbers are LA805 (westbound) and LA804 (eastbound).

In November 2017, the company announced the opening of a direct air route to the continent of Asia. The route operated with a flight departing from Santiago, Chile – made a stop in Sao Paulo, Brazil – and from there it proceeded a direct flight to Tel Aviv, Israel. The flights were operated three times a week starting from December 2018 until 2020, using the company's  Boeing 787. This was the second air route operated by a South-American company from South America to Asia.

Codeshare agreements
LATAM Chile codeshares with the following airlines:

Aeroméxico
Air China
Alaska Airlines
British Airways
Cathay Pacific
Finnair
Iberia
Japan Airlines
Jetstar Airways
Korean Air
LATAM Brasil
LATAM Paraguay
Malaysia Airlines
Qantas
Qatar Airways
WestJet

Fleet

Current fleet
, the LATAM Chile fleet consists of the following aircraft:

Fleet development
LATAM Chile became the launch customer for the Pratt & Whitney PW6000 engine on the Airbus A318. Its Airbus A319s and Airbus A320s are equipped with the IAE V2500s or CFM56s engines. LATAM Chile renovated its Boeing 767s, adding amenities like flat bed seats in Premium Business class, which offers 180 degrees of recline, and new touch screen personal TVs with on-demand content.

In May 2008, LATAM Chile retired its last 737 from service and was replaced by the Airbus A320s. In addition to its A320 family aircraft and Boeing 767, LATAM Chile bought the Boeing 787 for its long haul routes such as Auckland, Sydney and European routes, replacing its Airbus A340-300s, that left the fleet in April 2015. With this new aircraft, they plan to open new routes like Chicago O'Hare and Rome-Fiumicino. In 2011, LATAM Chile ordered 10 A318s but has since sold these to Avianca Brasil, to purchase another 128 airliners from the A320 family and 1 more order of A340-300. That year the airline placed orders for more Airbus A320 and brand new Airbus A321 aircraft. LATAM Chile is the American launch customer for the Sharklets for its A320 fleet.

In 2012, LATAM Chile became the launch customer in the Americas of the Boeing 787 Dreamliner.

On November 23, 2014, the airline received their first Airbus A321. This has been the domestic flagship of the airline ever since.

On April 17, 2015, the airline officially retired the Airbus A340-300 from their fleet, the last one being CC-CQA.

In December 2017 the airline received their first Airbus A320neo. However, months later these were grounded due to an issue with the Pratt & Whitney PW1000G engines. LATAM Chile faced many problems caused by both groundings of A320neo and Boeing 787 aircraft during 2018. Later that year, they started recovering from that.

In 2021, LATAM Chile acquired four Boeing 787-9 aircraft that used to fly for Norwegian Air Shuttle, which will enter service by late 2022 towards 2023.

Former fleet
LATAM Chile had also operated these following aircraft since it started services on the Santiago-Ovalle, Copiapó-Antofagasta-Iquique-Arica route with a de Havilland Gipsy Moth in 1929.

LATAM Pass
LATAM Chile created the LANPASS frequent flyer program to reward customer loyalty. There are currently over four million members. Every year, over 250,000 LANPASS members fly for free. LANPASS members earn miles every time they fly with LATAM Chile, a LANPASS-affiliated airline or by using the services of any LANPASS-associated business around the world.

The LANPASS Program has five Elite membership categories:

Gold 
Gold Plus 
Platinum 
Black 
Black Signature

On May 5, 2016, LANPASS became known as LATAM Pass, once LAN Chile fully transitioned into LATAM Chile.

Lounges

LATAM Airlines operates VIP passenger lounges at the following airports:

Mistral Lounge at Comodoro Arturo Merino Benitez Airport, in Santiago de Chile
Neruda Lounge at Comodoro Arturo Merino Benitez Airport, in Santiago de Chile
Ezeiza International Airport, in Buenos Aires, Argentina
El Dorado International Airport, in Bogotá, Colombia
Miami International Airport
São Paulo–Guarulhos International Airport

These lounges are accessible for passengers travelling in LATAM First Class, Premium Business, Business and Premium Economy, as well as senior members of the LATAM PASS program (Black, Platinum levels).

The new and renovated LATAM Chile Passenger lounges are designed by Chilean architect Mathias Klotz and Parisian Studio Putman Olivia Putman.

Accidents and incidents
On April 3, 1961, LAN Chile Flight 621, a Douglas C-47A registered as CC-CLD, on a scheduled domestic passenger flight from Temuco Airport (now Maquehue Airport, later La Araucania Airport) to Santiago, crashed into a hillside due to inclement weather near La Gotera Hill, Chile. On board were many members of the Chilean association football club C.D. Green Cross. All four crew members and all twenty passengers on board were killed.
 On February 6, 1965, a Douglas DC-6, operating LAN Chile Flight 107 from Santiago to Ezeiza, Argentina, flew into a mountain near the San José Volcano in the Las Melosas area of the Andes shortly after takeoff. All of the 87 passengers and crew on board died in what is as of 2012 the worst aircraft accident in Chile.
 On April 28, 1969 LAN Chile Flight 160 crashed short of runway at Colina, Chile. None of the 60 passengers and crew were injured in the accident.
 On December 5, 1969, a Douglas C-47A registration CC-CBY, crashed shortly after takeoff from El Tepual Airport, Puerto Montt. The aircraft was operating a cargo flight; all three people on board survived.
 On May 25, 1972, a Boeing 727-100 registration CC-CAG, made an emergency landing at Sir Donald Sangster International Airport after a pipe bomb exploded on board. The aircraft was operating a passenger flight from Tocumen International Airport to Miami International Airport; there were no fatalities or injuries.
 On August 3, 1978, a Boeing 707 registered as CC-CCX was approaching Ministro Pistarini International Airport in thick fog when it struck trees in a gentle descent, some 2500 metres short of the runway threshold and 300 metres out of line with the runway centreline. All 63 people on board the aircraft survived the accident.
 On August 4, 1987, a Boeing 737-200, while on the approach at El Loa Airport, landed short of the displaced threshold of runway 27. The nosegear collapsed and the aircraft broke in two. A fire broke out 30 minutes later and destroyed the aircraft. The threshold was displaced by 880m due to construction work. There was one fatality.
 On February 19, 1991, a chartered BAe 146–200 operating LAN Chile Flight 1069, overran the runway on landing at Puerto Williams in southern Chile and sank in the nearby waters. Of the 73 people aboard, 20 perished.
 On May 18, 2013, an Airbus A340, departing for Sydney from Auckland Airport lined-up on what was thought to be the centre line of the runway. Instead, it was actually the lights on the edge of the runway and the crew took off without noticing it. The damage wasn't discovered until a runway inspection was made.
On 26 October 2022, LATAM Chile Flight 1325, an Airbus A320-214, was on approach to Silvio Pettirossi International Airport when the aircraft encountered a hail storm. The aircraft lost most of its nose radome, suffered damage to its windshield and lost both engines which led to the Ram Air Turbine being deployed. The aircraft made an emergency landing at Asunción with no injuries aboard.
On 18 November 2022, LATAM Perú Flight 2213, an Airbus A320-271N operated by LATAM Chile, struck a fire truck during its rejected takeoff roll at runway 16 of Jorge Chávez International Airport. The right main landing gear of the aircraft collapsed and the right hand engine separated from the collision, which started a fire. Everyone aboard the aircraft survived with 24 people sustaining injuries, however both firefighters aboard the fire truck were killed.

See also
List of airlines of Chile

References

External links

 
 LAN Airlines inflight magazine

Companies formerly listed on the New York Stock Exchange
Airlines of Chile
Latin American and Caribbean Air Transport Association
Chile
Chilean brands
Multinational companies headquartered in Chile
Airlines established in 1929
Airline holding companies
Chilean companies established in 1929
Holding companies of Chile
Former Oneworld members